HMS Glasgow was a 20-gun sixth-rate post ship of the Royal Navy. She was launched in 1757 and took part in the American Revolutionary War. While under command of Capt. William Maltby she ran onto rocks at Cohasset, Massachusetts on 10 December, 1774. Refloated and arrived in Boston on the 15th for repairs. Capt. Maltby was relieved of command at a Court Martial and replaced by Tyringham Howe some time between 8-15 January, 1775. She is most famous for her encounter with the maiden voyage of the Continental Navy off Block Island on 6 April 1776.  In that action, Glasgow engaged a squadron of 6 ships of the Continental Navy, managing to escape intact. She captured a prize in April, 1778, but it sprang a leak and sank.

She later chased two large Continental frigates in the Caribbean before she was accidentally burned in Montego Bay, Jamaica in 1779.

References

Rif Winfield, British Warships in the Age of Sail 1714–1792: Design, Construction, Careers and Fates. Seaforth Publishing, 2007. .

External links
 Royal Navy History

Post ships of the Royal Navy
1757 ships
Maritime incidents in 1779